FERM Domain Containing 4A is a gene, located on human Chromosome 10 at 10p13, that encodes FERM Domain Containing Protein 4A.

References 

Genes on human chromosome 10